
Gmina Miękinia is a rural gmina (administrative district) in Środa Śląska County, Lower Silesian Voivodeship, in south-western Poland.

It is part of the larger Wrocław metropolitan area.

Neighbouring gminas
Gmina Miękinia is bordered by the town of Wrocław and the gminas of Brzeg Dolny, Kąty Wrocławskie, Kostomłoty, Oborniki Śląskie and Środa Śląska.

Villages
The gmina contains the villages of Białków, Błonie, Brzezina, Brzezinka Średzka, Czerna, Gałów, Głoska, Gosławice, Kadłub, Krępice, Księginice, Lenartowice, Łowęcice, Lubiatów, Lutynia, Miękinia, Mrozów, Pisarzowice, Prężyce, Radakowice, Wilkostów, Wilkszyn, Wojnowice, Wróblowice, Zabór Wielki, Zakrzyce, Źródła and Żurawiniec.

Twin towns – sister cities

Gmina Miękinia is twinned with:
 Oria, Italy
 Schwarmstedt, Germany

References

Miekinia
Środa Śląska County